This article lists diplomatic missions resident in France.  At present, the capital city of Paris hosts 161 embassies. Major cities such as Lyon, Marseille, and Strasbourg are host to consulates and consulates-general.

France also hosts the headquarters of international organizations, the most important being the Organisation for Economic Co-operation and Development (OECD) and the United Nations Educational, Scientific and Cultural Organization (UNESCO) in Paris, and the Council of Europe in Strasbourg. As such, several sending countries may have missions or delegations to those organizations that are separate from their embassies in Paris or their consulates in Strasbourg.

Several other countries have non-resident ambassadors accredited to France, with most being resident in Brussels or London.

This listing excludes honorary consulates and trade missions.

Diplomatic missions in Paris

Embassies

Missions to the Organisation for Economic Co-operation and Development (OECD)

Other missions or delegations or de facto embassies 
 (Delegation)
 (Representative Office)
 (Office — Resident in Nouméa, New Caledonia)
 (General Delegation)
 (General Delegation)
 (General Delegation)
 (Delegation)

Missions to the Council of Europe in Strasbourg 

 (Liaison Office)

Consular missions

Aix-en-Provence


Bastia

Bayonne

Besançon
 (Consulate)

Bobigny
 (Consulate)

Bordeaux

 (Consulate-General)
 (Consulate-General)

 (Consulate)

Cayenne, French Guiana

Créteil
 Consulate

Fort-de-France, Martinique

Grenoble
 (Consulate)
 (Consulate)

Lyon

 (Consulate-General)

 (Vice-consulate)
 (Consulate-General)
 (Consulate-General)

 (Consular Office)

 (Consulate-General)
 (Consulate-General)

 (Consulate-General)

 (Consulate)

Marseille

 (Consulate-General)
 (Consulate-General)

 (Consulate)

 (Consulate-General)
 (Consulate-General)

 (Consulate-General)
 (Consulate-General)

 (Consulate-General)

Metz
 (Consulate)
 (Consulate-General)

Montpellier
 (Consulate-General)

Nanterre
 (Consulate)

Nantes
 (Consulate)
 (Consular office)

Nice

 (Consulate)

Nouméa, New Caledonia

 

 (Consular Office)

Orléans
 (Consulate-General)

Orly
 (Consulate-General)

Pantin
 (Consulate)

Papeete, French Polynesia
 
 (Consulate)

Pau

Perpignan

Pointe-à-Pitre, Guadeloupe

Pontoise
 (Consulate)
 (Consulate-General)

Rennes
 (Consulate-General)
 (Consulate)

Saint-Denis, Réunion

Saint-Étienne
 (Consulate)

Saint-Georges, French Guiana
 (Consulate)

Strasbourg

 (Office)
 (Consulate-General)

 (Representative Office)
 (Consulate-General)
 (Consulate-General)

 (Consulate-General)
 (Consulate)

Toulouse

 (Consulate-General)
 (Consulate)

 (Consulate)

Villemomble
 (Consulate-General)

Non-resident embassies accredited to France
Resident in Berlin, Germany

 

Resident in Brussels, Belgium

 
 
 
 
 
 
 
 
 
 
 

Resident in London, United Kingdom

Closed missions

See also 
 Foreign relations of France
 List of diplomatic missions in Paris
 Visa requirements for French citizens

Notes

References

External links 
 Paris Diplomatic List
 Missions to the OECD

 
France
Diplomatic missions